Leandro Gabriel Torres (born 4 November 1988) is an Argentine football player. He usually plays as an attacking midfielder.

Career
Torres began his playing career in 2006 with Newell's Old Boys, he made his league debut on 5 November 2006 in a 0–1 home defeat to Independiente. After making 38 league appearances for Newell's Torres joined Godoy Cruz in 2009. In July 2010, he was loaned with an option to buy to Ecuadorian side Emelec.

Honours
Buriram United
Kor Royal Cup: 2014

External links
 Argentine Primera statistics

1988 births
Living people
Footballers from Rosario, Santa Fe
Argentine footballers
Argentine expatriate footballers
Argentina under-20 international footballers
Association football midfielders
Expatriate footballers in Ecuador
Expatriate footballers in Chile
Expatriate footballers in Thailand
Expatriate footballers in Belarus
Expatriate footballers in Mexico
Argentine expatriate sportspeople in Ecuador
Argentine expatriate sportspeople in Chile
Argentine expatriate sportspeople in Thailand
Argentine expatriate sportspeople in Belarus
Argentine expatriate sportspeople in Mexico
Argentine Primera División players
Ecuadorian Serie A players
Chilean Primera División players
Leandro Torres
Primera B de Chile players
Belarusian Premier League players
Ascenso MX players
Liga de Expansión MX players
Newell's Old Boys footballers
Godoy Cruz Antonio Tomba footballers
C.S. Emelec footballers
Santiago Wanderers footballers
Leandro Torres
Coquimbo Unido footballers
FC Belshina Bobruisk players
FC Dynamo Brest players
Atlético San Luis footballers
Tampico Madero F.C. footballers
Alebrijes de Oaxaca players